The following is a list of notable people who have studied from or taught in Jadavpur University.

A name may be listed multiple times due to their more than one workplace, contribution or affiliations.

Notable alumni

Academics
For academics on science, see Researchers and Academics on Science section.
The below list is for academics of literature and humanities:
 Barnita Bagchi, faculty of literary studies at Utrecht University, historian
Chinmoy Guha, professor in English at University of Calcutta
 Himani Bannerji, faculty in department of Sociology, York University in Canada
Julie Mehta, faculty at University of Toronto
Nandini Das, professor of Early Modern Literature and Culture in the English faculty at the University of Oxford
 Rohit K. Dasgupta, academic at School of Culture and Creative Arts at the University of Glasgow
Swapan Kumar Chakravorty, faculty at Presidency University
 Anup Kumar Das, faculty at Jawaharlal Nehru University

The below list is for academics of commerce:
 Amitava Chattopadhyay, faculty and Professor of Marketing at INSEAD
Sugato Chakravarty, faculty at Purdue University

Researchers and Academics on Science
Abhik Ghosh, inorganic chemist and materials scientist, faculty at University of Tromsø in Tromsø, Norway
 Alok Krishna Gupta, mineralogist, petrologist, Shanti Swarup Bhatnagar Prize for Science and Technology awardee
 Amitabha Mukhopadhyay, cell biologist, Shanti Swarup Bhatnagar laureate, professor at the National Institute of Immunology
Aninda Sinha, associate professor at Center for High Energy Physics, Indian Institute of Science 
Bandula Wijay, Professor of Clinical Medicine at the Kotelawala Defense University
Bimal Kumar Bachhawat, neurochemist and glycobiologist, known for his discovery of HMG-CoA lyase, awarded with Padma Bhushan
Chinmoy Sankar Dey, faculty at IIT Delhi
Debabrata Goswami, chemist, elected Fellow of the Royal Society of Chemistry, Fellow of the Institute of Physics, the SPIE, and The Optical Society, senior Member of the IEEE, faculty at IIT Kanpur
Dipankar Chatterji Indian molecular biologist, Shanti Swarup Bhatnagar laureate
Ipsita Biswas, terminal ballistics scientist, awarded with India's highest civilian award for women, the "Narishakti Puruskar", faculty at Molecular Biophysics Unit, Indian Institute of Science
 K. S. Dasgupta, former director of the Indian Institute of Space Science and Technology
 Manoj Majee, molecular biologist, N-Bios laureate and a senior scientist at the National Institute of Plant Genome Research (NIPGR)
Nandita Basu, researcher at University of Waterloo in the field of Water Sustainability and Ecohydrology
 Nibir Mandal, structural geologist, Shanti Swarup Bhatnagar laureate, faculty of Geological sciences at Jadavpur University
 Ujjwal Maulik, Computer Scientist and Professor, First Faculty member in Jadavpur University to be elected IEEE Fellow
Monita Chatterjee, auditory scientist at Boys Town National Research Hospital 
 Partha Sarathi Mukherjee, inorganic chemist, Shanti Swarup Bhatnagar laureate
 Palash Sarkar, cryptologist, mathematician, awarded with Shanti Swarup Bhatnagar
 Pinaki Majumdar, condensed matter physicist, Shanti Swarup Bhatnagar laureate
 Pran Ranjan Sengupta, mathematician
 Pulak Sengupta, petrologist, Shanti Swarup Bhatnagar laureate
Rajdeep Dasgupta, professor of Earth, Environmental, and Planetary Sciences at Rice University
 Samir Das, professor of computer science at Stony Brook University
 Samaresh Bhattacharya, inorganic chemist, Shanti Swarup Bhatnagar laureate
Sandeep Shukla, faculty at Indian Institute of Technology, Kanpur
Santanu Bose, Associate Professor, National School of Drama, (NSD) New Delhi
Sarit Kumar Das, professor of the department of mechanical engineering at Indian Institute of Technology Madras
 Shantanu Chowdhury, structural biologist, Shanti Swarup Bhatnagar and N-BIOS laureates
Shehla Pervin, breast cancer specialist
 Shireen Akhter, Bengali academic in University of Chittagong
 Snehasikta Swarnakar, cancer biologist, N-Bios laureate
Somnath Dasgupta, professor of metamorphic geology at Indian Institute of Science Education and Research, Kolkata
 Souvik Maiti, biochemist, Shanti Swarup Bhatnagar and N-BIOS laureate, faculty at the Institute of Genomics and Integrative Biology
 Subrata Adak, chemical biologist, N-Bios laureate
 Subrata Roy, professor, inventor, scientist
 Sunil Kumar Manna, immunologist, N-Bios laureate
 Suvendra Nath Bhattacharyya, molecular biologist, Shanti Swarup Bhatnagar and N-BIOS laureate
 Syed Samsuddin Ahmed, founder and vice chancellor of Bangamata Sheikh Fojilatunnesa Mujib Science & Technology University
Tamal Dey, professor of Mathematics and Computer science at Purdue University
Sankar Bhattacharya, Professor of the Department of Chemical Engineering at Monash University and previously International Energy Agency
Biswanath Chakraborty, Professor of the Department of Mechanical Engineering at University of Witwatersrand and previously International Energy Agency

Engineers
Sushanta Mitra, mechanical engineer, elected fellow of the American Society of Mechanical Engineers, the Canadian Academy of Engineering, the Engineering Institute of Canada, Royal Society of Chemistry, the American Physical Society, and American Association for the Advancement of Science

Organizational heads
Amitabha Bhattacharyya, former director of the Indian Institute of Technology, Kanpur
 Arundhati Bhattacharya, first woman chairperson of State Bank of India
 Chinmoy Guha, former vice-Chancellor of Rabindra Bharati University
Dipak K. Das, former director of the Cardiovascular Research Center at the University of Connecticut Health Center in Farmington
Jonathan Anthony Mason, former Headmaster of  St. James' School, Kolkata, the Modern High School in Dubai, and the Doon School, former House Master at La Martiniere College, Kolkata and former principal at  St. James' School, Kolkata
 K. S. Dasgupta, former director of the Indian Institute of Space Science and Technology
 Mohd. Rafiqul Alam Beg, former vice chancellor of Rajshahi University of Engineering & Technology
Pinaki Majumdar, director of the Harish-Chandra Research Institute
 Ramaranjan Mukherji, former chancellor of Rashtriya Sanskrit Vidyapeeth, Padma Shri recipient
Saroj Ghose, former director of Birla Industrial & Technological Museum and former director general of the National Council of Science Museums, Government of India, former President of the International Council of Museums in Paris during 1992-98
Sarit Kumar Das, former director at IIT Ropar
 Sivaji Bandyopadhyay, director of National Institute of Technology Silchar
 Shireen Akhter, first female vice chancellor of the University of Chittagong in University of Chittagong
 Somnath Dasgupta, former vice-chancellor of Assam University
 Subir Raha, former Director of Oil and Natural Gas Corporation
 Rajat K Baisya, Former Head and Dean of Management Sciences, IIT, Delhi
Sunil Kumar Manna, former head of the immunology lab of the Centre for DNA Fingerprinting and Diagnostics
 Syed Samsuddin Ahmed, founder and vice chancellor of Bangamata Sheikh Fojilatunnesa Mujib Science & Technology University

Literature personalities 
Anuradha Bhattacharyya, writer
Hayat Mamud, Bangladeshi essayist, poet
Himani Bannerji,  writer, sociologist, scholar
 Kajal Bandyopadhyay, poet
Kunal Basu, English friction writer
Nabaneeta Dev Sen, writer
 Neel Mukherjee, novelist
 Ramaranjan Mukherji, writer
Riksundar Banerjee, writer
Rohini Chowdhury, writer and literary translator
 Sibaji Bandyopadhyay, author and critic
 Sudhir Chakraborty, educationist and essayist

Music and cine personalities
 Anupam Roy, singer and film music director
 Arnab Ray, blogger and author
Badal Sarkar, dramatist and theatre director
Bidita Bag, actress
 Bickram Ghosh, Indian classical tabla player
Churni Ganguly, film and television actress
 Debalina Majumder, documentary director
 Hemanta Mukherjee, Playback Singer, Composer, Music Director, Producer, Film Director
Jayant Kripalani, film, television and stage actor, director and trainer
J. P. Shaw, Regional Director (East) for India Tourism-Kolkata under the Ministry of Tourism, a branch of the Government of India
 Kabir Suman, singer, songwriter and Music Composer
Kalika Prasad Bhattacharya, Indian folk singer
 Kaushik Ganguly, Indian film director
 Kaushiki Chakraborty, Hindustani classical vocalist
Kushal Chakraborty, singer and film director
Moushumi Bhowmik, singer, songwriter
Moon Moon Sen, actress
 Onir, Indian film and TV director
 Parambrata Chatterjee, actor
Payel Sarkar, actress
 Ranjan Ghosh, filmmaker
 Ranjon Ghoshal, theatre director and musician
Ritabhari Chakraborty, actress
 Rituparno Ghosh, film director, actor
Ruchira Panda, Indian classical vocalist
 Santanu Bose, Indian-theatre director and drama teacher
 Saroj Ghose, former director of Birla Industrial and Technological Museum
 Shiboprosad Mukherjee, filmmaker, writer, actor
Shreyan Chattopadhyay, composer, singer-songwriter, music producer and director
 Swapan Chaudhuri, tabla player
Swastika Mukherjee, actress
 Suhel Seth, actor
Ujaan Ganguly, film and theatre actor
Rwitobroto Mukherjee, film and theatre actor
Aloy Deb Barma, filmmaker

Politicians
 Manabendra Nath Roy, political activist, He was Founder of the Mexican Communist Party and the Communist Party of India.
 Amitabh Bagchi, senior Politburo member of Communist Party of India (Maoist), one of the founders of Central Organising Committee, Communist Party of India (Marxist–Leninist) Party Unity.
 Mohammed Salim, politician from Communist Party of India (Marxist).
 Sankar Gupta, former MLA from Communist Party of India (Marxist).
Sujan Chakraborty, former MLA from Communist Party of India (Marxist).
Gobinda Chandra Naskar, former MLA and MP from Indian National Congress and MLA from All India Trinamool Congress.
Abhijit Mukherjee, former MP from Indian National Congress.
 Rohit K. Dasgupta, Labour Party Politician.

Judiciary
Barnita Bagchi, feminist advocate

Businessmen
Amitava Chattopadhyay, businessman at GlaxoSmithKline
Bandula Wijay, 
Rubana Huq, chairperson of Bangladeshi conglomerate "Mohammadi Group"
 Suhel Seth, businessman

Journalists
Ananta Charan Sukla, the Founding Editor of Journal of Comparative Literature and Aesthetics 
Julie Mehta
Nayan Chanda, founder and editor-in-chief of YaleGlobal Online, online magazine from Yale Center for the Study of Globalization 
Paulami Sengupta, executive editor of Bengali magazines under ABP House in India

Others
Kurchi Dasgupta, painter, art critic, actor and translator
Mohit Ray, environmental and human rights activist
Vinayak Chakravorty, film critic, Entertainment Editor at the Indo-Asian News Service (IANS) news agency

Notable faculty
This following list shows notable people, who have taught in Jadavpur University, formerly or currently.
Alokeranjan Dasgupta
Amalendu De
Amar Nath Bhaduri
Amartya Sen
Amita Chatterjee
Amitabha Bhattacharyya
Amlan Das Gupta
Ananda Lal
Buddhadeva Bose
David McCutchion
Deb Shankar Ray
Dipan Ghosh
Subir Kumar Ghosh
Jasodhara Bagchi
Mrinal Datta Chaudhuri
Nibir Mandal
Ujjwal Maulik
Paritosh Sen
Pulak Sengupta
Pulok Mukherjee
Rimi B. Chatterjee
Robert Antoine
Rabindra Kumar Das Gupta
Samita Sen
Sankar Sen
Sivaji Bandyopadhyay
Shankha Ghosh
Subhrangsu Kanta Acharyya
Subir Kumar Ghosh
Sudipta Sengupta
Sukanta Chaudhuri
Supriya Chaudhuri
Swapan Kumar Chakravorty
Tathagata Roy
Triguna Sen

References

External links
Official website of Jadavpur University Alumni Association
Global Jadavpur University Alumni Foundation

Jadavpur University alumni